Margaret Livingston (born Marguerite Livingston; November 25, 1895 – December 13, 1984), sometimes credited as Marguerite Livingstone or Margaret Livingstone, was an American film actress and businesswoman during the silent film era. She is remembered today as "the Woman from the City" in F. W. Murnau's 1927 film Sunrise: A Song of Two Humans.

Early life
Livingston was born in Salt Lake City, Utah to John Livingston, a Scottish immigrant, and Eda Livingston (née Frome), who was born in Stockholm, Sweden. She was raised in Salt Lake City along with her older sister, Ivy, who also became a film actress.

Career
The young Livingston made her debut in films in 1916. She made over 50 films during the "silent era," most notably in F.W. Murnau's Sunrise: A Song of Two Humans, and a further 20 films after she successfully made the transition to sound film in 1929, including Smart Money starring Edward G. Robinson and James Cagney.  She occasionally dubbed voices for some other actresses, including Louise Brooks for The Canary Murder Case (1929).

Livingston was a guest on  William Randolph Hearst's yacht the Oneida during the weekend in November 1924 with film director and producer Thomas Ince, who later died of heart failure. In the Peter Bogdanovich film The Cat's Meow (2001), Livingston, played by Claudia Harrison, is depicted as having an affair with Ince at the time of his death.

Later life
On August 18, 1931, Livingston married the band leader Paul Whiteman in a ceremony in Denver, Colorado. She retired from film acting in 1934. Livingston was unable to have children, and adopted four with her husband. She spent the remainder of her life investing in oil ventures and real estate, and was a partner in the construction of the Colonial House in West Hollywood, California.

Death
Livingston died in Warrington, Pennsylvania on December 13, 1984, at age 89.

Filmography

The Chain Invisible (1916) as Elizabeth King
Alimony (1917) as Florence (as Marguerite Livingston)
Within the Cup (1918) as Minor Role
The Busher (1919) (uncredited)
All Wrong (1919) as Ethel Goodwin (as Marguerite Livingston)
Haunting Shadows (1919) as Marian Deveraux (as Marguerite Livingston)
What's Your Husband Doing? (1920) as Madge Mitchell
Water, Water, Everywhere (1920) as Martha Beecher
Hairpins (1920) as Effie Wainwright
The Brute Master (1920) as The Native 'Taupou'
The Parish Priest (1920) as Agnnes Cassidy
Lying Lips (1921) as Lelia Dodson
The Home Stretch (1921) as Molly
Colorado Pluck (1921) as Angela Featherstone
Passing Through (1921) as Louise Kingston
 Eden and Return (1921) as Connie Demarest
The Social Buccaneer (1923) as Princess Elise
Divorce (1923) as Gloria Gayne
Love's Whirlpool (1924) as A Maid
Wandering Husbands (1924) as Marilyn Foster
Her Marriage Vow (1924) as Estelle Winslow
Butterfly (1924) as Violet Van De Wort
The Chorus Lady (1924) as Patricia O'Brien
The First Year (1926) as Mrs. Barstow
Capital Punishment (1925) as Mona Caldwell
Up the Ladder (1925) as Helen Newhall
I'll Show You the Town (1925) as Lucille Pemberton
Greater Than a Crown (1925) as Molly Montrose
The Wheel (1925) as Elsie Dixon
Havoc (1925) as Violet Deering
After Marriage (1925) as Alma Lathrop
The Best People (1925) as Millie Montgomery
When the Door Opened (1925) as Mrs. Grenfal
Wages for Wives (1925) as Carol Bixby
The Yankee Señor (1926) as Flora
Hell's Four Hundred (1926) as Evelyn Vance
A Trip to Chinatown (1926) as Alicia Cuyer
The Blue Eagle (1926) as Mrs. Mary Rohan
Womanpower (1926) as Dot
Breed of the Sea (1926) as Marietta Rawdon
Slaves of Beauty (1927) as Goldie
Secret Studio (1927) as Nina Clark
Lightning (1927) as Dot Deal / Little Eva
Married Alive (1927) as Amy Duxbury
The Girl from Gay Paree (1927) as Gertie
Sunrise: A Song of Two Humans (1927) as The Woman from the City
American Beauty (1927) as Mrs. Gillespie
Streets of Shanghai (1927) as Sadie
A Woman's Way (1928) as Liane
Mad Hour (1928) as Maid
The Scarlet Dove (1928) as Olga
Wheel of Chance (1928) as Josie Drew
The Way of the Strong (1928) as Marie
Say It With Sables (1928) as Irene Gordon
Through the Breakers (1928) as Diane Garrett
Beware of Bachelors (1928) as Miss Pfeffer, the vamp
His Private Life (1928) as Yvette Bérgere
The Apache (1928) as Sonya
The Last Warning (1929) as Evalynda Hendon
Dreary House (1928) as Nancy Crowl
The Bellamy Trial (1929) as Mimi Bellamy
The Canary Murder Case (1929, voice only, dubbed dialogue for Louise Brooks) as Margaret Odell (uncredited)
The Office Scandal (1929) as Lillian Tracy
The Charlatan (1929) as Florence Talbot
Innocents of Paris (1929) as Madame Renard
The Girl Who Wouldn't Wait (1929) as Judy Judd
Tonight at Twelve (1929) as Nan Stoddard
Acquitted (1929) as Marian Smith
Seven Keys to Baldpate (1929) as Myra Thornhill
Murder on the Roof (1930) as Marcia
For the Love o' Lil (1930) as Eleanor Cartwright
What a Widow! (1930) as Valli
Big Money (1930) as Mae
The Lady Refuses (1931) as Berthine Waller
Kiki (1931) as Paulette Vaile
God's Gift to Women (1931) as Tania Donaliff
Smart Money (1931) as District Attorney's girl
Broadminded (1931) as Mabel Robinson
Call Her Savage (1932) as Molly
Social Register (1934) as Gloria (final film role)

References

Further reading

External links

Margaret Livingston at Virtual History

1895 births
1984 deaths
Actresses from Salt Lake City
American film actresses
American silent film actresses
American people of Scottish descent
American people of Swedish descent
20th-century American actresses